Verses of Refuge (Arabic: المعوذتان) (romanized: Al-Mu'awwidhatayn), sometimes translated as "Verses of Refuge", is an Arabic term referring to the last two suras (chapters) of the Qur'an, viz. Daybreak (ch. 113), and Mankind (ch. 114), which are two consecutive short prayers both beginning with the verse "Say: I seek refuge in the Lord of...". Although these two suras are separate entities in the Qur'an and also are written in the Mushaf under separate names, they are so deeply related with their contents closely resembling each other's that they have been designated by the common name 'al-Mu'awwidhatayn' (the two suras in which refuge with Allah has been sought). Imam Baihaqi in 'Dala'il an-Nubuwwah' has written that these suras were revealed together, and hence their combined name of al-Mu'awwidhatayn. There is a Sunnah tradition from Muhammad of reading them over the sick or before sleeping and they are also considered a healing.

Occasion of Revelation
 Also see: Praying.

Hasan Basri, ' 'Ata' and Jābir ibn Zayd say that these surahs are Makki. A tradition from 'Abdullah bin 'Abbas also supports the same view. However, according to another tradition from him, it is Madani and the same view is held also by 'Abdullah bin Zubair and Qatadah. One of the traditions which strengthens this second view is the Hadith which Muslim, Tirmidhi, Nasa'i and Imam Ahmad bin Hanbal have related on the authority of 'Uqbah bin 'Amir. He says that Muhammad one day said to him: "Do you know what kind of verses have been revealed to me tonight? — these matchless verses are *A'udhu bi-Rabbi l-falaq* and *A'udhu bi-Rabbi n-nas*. This Hadith is used as an argument for these suras to be Madani because 'uqbah bin 'Amir had become a Muslim in Madinah after the hijrah, as related by Abu Da'ud and Nasa'i on the basis of his own statement. Other traditions which have lent strength to this view are those related by Ibn Sa'd, Muhiyy-us-Sunnah Baghawi, Imam Nasafi, Imam Baihaqi, Hafiz Ibn Hajar, Hafiz Badr-uddin 'Ayni, 'Abd bin Humaid and others to the effect that these suras were revealed when the Jews had worked magic on Muhammad in Madinah and he had fallen ill under its effect. Ibn Sa'd has related on the authority of Waqidi that this happened in A.H. 7. On this very basis Sufyan ibn `Uyaynah also has described these suras as Madani.

But (as explained by Sayyid Abul Ala Maududi in his Tafhim-ul-Quran under the Introduction to verses of refuge), when it is said about a certain sura or verse that it was revealed on this or that particular occasion, it does not necessarily mean that it was revealed for the first time on that very occasion. Rather it sometimes so happened that a sura or a verse had previously been revealed, then on the occurrence or appearance of a particular incident or situation, Muhammad's attention was drawn to it by Allah for the second time, or even again and again. In Sayyid Abul Ala Maududi's opinion the same also was the case with the Verses of Refuge. The subject matter of these suras is explicit that these were sent down at Makkah in the first instance when opposition to Muhammad there had grown very intense. Later, when at Madinah storms of opposition were raised by the hypocrites, Jews and polytheists, Muhammad was instructed to recite these very chapters, as has been mentioned in the above cited tradition from Uqbah bin Amir. After this, when magic was worked on him, and his illness grew intense, angel Gabriel came and instructed him by Allah's command to recite these very chapters. Therefore, in the same opinion, the view held by the commentators who describe both these chapters as Makki is more reliable. Regarding them as connected exclusively with the incident of magic is difficult, for to this incident related only one verse (v.4), the remaining verses of Sūrat of Daybreak and the whole of Sūrat of Mankind have nothing to do with it directly.

Theme and subject matter
The conditions under which these two suras were sent down in Makkah were as follows. As soon as Muhammed began to preach the message of Islam, it seemed as though he had provoked all classes of the people around him. As his message spread the opposition of the disbelieving Quraish also became more and more intense. As long as they had any hope that they would be able to prevent him from preaching his message by throwing some temptation in his way, or striking some bargain with him, their hostility did not become very active. But when Muhammad disappointed them completely that he would not effect any kind of compromise with them in the matter of faith, and in Sūrat Disbelievers they were plainly told: "I do not worship those who you worship nor are you worshipers of Him Whom I worship. For you is your religion and for me is mine", the hostility touched its extreme limits. More particularly, the families whose members (men or women, boys or girls) had accepted Islam, were burning with rage from within against Muhammad. They were cursing him, holding secret consultations to kill him quietly in the dark of the night so that the Banu Hashim could not discover the murderer and take revenge; magic and charms were being worked on him so as to cause his death, or make him fall ill, or become mad; satans from among the men and the jinn spread on every side so as to whisper one or another evil into the hearts of the people against him and the Qur'an brought by him so that they became suspicious of him and fled him. There were many people who were burning with jealousy against him, for they could not tolerate that a man from another family or clan than their own should flourish and become prominent. For instance, the reason why Abu Jahl was crossing every limit in his hostility to him has been explained by himself: "We and the Bani Abdi Manaf (to which the Holy Prophet belonged) were rivals of each other: they fed others, we too fed others; they provided conveyances to the people, we too did the same; they gave donations, we too gave donations, so much so that when they and we have become equal in honor and nobility, they now proclaim that they have a Prophet who is inspired from the heaven; how can we compete with them in this field? By God, we will never acknowledge him, nor affirm faith in him". (Source Ibn Hisham, vol. I, pp. 337–338).

Such were the conditions when Muhammad was commanded to tell the people: "I seek refuge with the Lord of the dawn, from the evil of everything that He has created, and from the evil of the darkness of night and from the evil of magicians, men and women, and from the evil of the envious", and to tell them: "I seek refuge with the Lord of mankind, the King of mankind, and the Deity of mankind, from the evil of the whisperer, who returns over and over again, who whispers (evil) into the hearts of men, whether he be from among the jinn or men." This is similar to what Moses had been told to say when Pharaoh had expressed his design before his full court to kill him: "I have taken refuge with my Lord and your Lord against every arrogant person who does not believe in the Day of Reckoning.". And: "I have taken refuge with my Lord and your Lord lest you should assail me."

On both occasions they were confronted with well-equipped, resourceful and powerful enemies. On both occasions they stood firm on their message against their strong opponents, whereas they had no material power on the strength of which they could fight them, and on both occasions they utterly disregarded the threats and dangerous plans and hostile devices of the enemy, saying: "We have taken refuge with the Lord of the universe against you." Obviously, such firmness and steadfastness can be shown only by the person who has the conviction that the power of His Lord is the supreme power, that all powers of the world are insignificant against Him, and that no one can harm the one who has taken His refuge. Only such a one can say: "I will not give up preaching the Word of Truth. I care the least for what you may say or do, for I have taken refuge with my Lord and your Lord and Lord of all universe."

The position of Ibn Mas`ud concerning Verses of Refuge 
Imam Ahmad recorded from Zirr bin Hubaysh that Ubayy bin Ka`b told him that Ibn Mas`ud did not record the verses of refuge in his Mushaf (copy of the Qur'an). So Ubayy said, "I testify that the Messenger of Allah informed me that Jibril said to him,

قُلْ أَعُوذُ بِرَبِّ الْفَلَق arabic in arab 

Translation: Say: "I seek refuge with the Lord of the Daybreak. (chapter of Daybreak 113:1)

So he said it. And Gabriel said to him,

قُلْ أَعُوذُ بِرَبِّ النَّاس (Arabic)

Translation: Say: "I seek refuge with the Lord of Mankind.") (Sūrat Mankind 114:1)

So he said it. Therefore, we say what the Prophet said."

The virtues of the Verses of Refuge 
 In his Sahih, Imam Muslim recorded on the authority of ‘Uqbah bin ‘Amir that the Prophet Muhammad said, "Do you not see that there have been Ayaat revealed to me tonight the like of which has not been seen before?" They are Say: "I seek refuge with, the Lord of daybreak." (Sūrat Daybreak 113:1) and; Say: “I seek refuge with the Lord of mankind.” (Sūrat Mankind 114:1)  This Hadith was recorded by Ahmad, At-Tirmidhi and An-Nasa'i. At-Tirmidhi said, “Hasan Sahih.” 
 According to Tafsir ibn Kathir, it has been reported from Abu Sa'id that Prophet Muhammad Peace be upon him used to seek protection from the evil eyes of the jinn and mankind.  But when verses of refuge were revealed, he used them (for protection) and abandoned all else besides them.  At-Tirmidhi, An-Nisai and ibn Majah recorded this.
 Narrated ‘Aisha: “Whenever Allah’s Apostle became sick, he would recite al-Mu'awwidhatayn (Sūrat Daybreak and Sūrat al-Naas) and then blow his breath over his body. When he became seriously ill, I used to recite (these two suras) and rub his hands over his body hoping for its blessings.

Relation between Sūrat of Opening and Verses of Refuge
 Also see: Opening
The last thing which is noteworthy with regard to the verses of refuge is the relation between the beginning and the end of the Qur'an. Although the Qur'an has not been arranged chronologically, Muhammed arranged in the present order the verses and suras revealed during 23 years on different occasions to meet different needs and situations. According to this order, the Qur'an opens with the Sūrat Opening and ends with the Mu'awwidhatayn.

In the beginning, after praising and glorifying Allah as Lord of the worlds, Kind, Merciful and Master of the Judgment Day, the believer submits: "Lord, You alone I worship and to You alone I turn for help, and the most urgent help that I need from You is to be guided to the Straight Way." In answer, he is given by Allah the whole Qur'an to show him the Straight Way, which is concluded thus: Man prays to Allah, Who is Lord of dawn, Lord of men, King of men, Deity of men, saying: "I seek refuge only with You for protection from every evil and mischief of every creature, and in particular, from the evil whisperings of devils, be they from among men or jinn, for they are the greatest obstacle in following the Straight Way." Sayyid Abul Ala Maududi thus says in his Tafheemul Quran  "The relation that the beginning bears with the end, cannot remain hidden from anyone who has understanding and insight."

See also 
 List of Islamic terms in Arabic
 Sūrat Daybreak
 Sūrat Mankind
 Sūrat Opening

References

Quranic verses
Islamic terminology
Chapters in the Quran